Tasha Hubbard is a Canadian First Nations/Cree filmmaker and educator based in Saskatoon, Saskatchewan. Hubbard's credits include three National Film Board of Canada documentaries exploring Indigenous rights in Canada: Two Worlds Colliding, a 2004 Canada Award-winning short film about the Saskatoon freezing deaths, Birth of a Family, a 2017 feature-length documentary about four siblings separated during Canada's Sixties Scoop, and nîpawistamâsowin: We Will Stand Up, a 2019 Hot Docs and DOXA Documentary award-winning documentary which examines the death of Colten Boushie, a young Cree man, and the subsequent trial and acquittal of the man who shot him.

Family
Born in 1973, Hubbard's birth name was Carrie Alaine Pinay. Her biological mother was a young single Saulteaux/Métis/Cree woman whose parents and grandparents, as well as Hubbard's Cree/Nakota father, were placed into the Canadian Indian residential school system. With limited support from family and social services, Hubbard's mother gave her to a social worker whom she trusted, putting her up for adoption through the Saskatchewan Adopt Indian Metis (AIM) pilot project, part of the Sixties Scoop. Raised on a farm near Avonlea, Saskatchewan, Hubbard's adoptive parents were supportive of her search; it was her adoptive mother who first asked Hubbard, at the age of 14, if she wanted to find her biological family. Their search yielded nothing for almost two years until they hired a Cree lawyer who located Hubbard's birth mother in just two weeks; a woman who turned out to be a friend of her biological father. She met her birth mother three days after her sixteenth birthday, followed by her father, three weeks later. She would go on to reunite with all ten of her siblings, the last, a sister, at the age of twenty-two.

Filmography

Two Worlds Colliding (2004) 
Two Worlds Colliding is a 2004 documentary following the experience of Darrell Night, an Indigenous man dumped by police in a field on the outskirts of Saskatchewan in January 2000 in -20 °C temperature. Investigating the "freezing deaths" of Indigenous peoples in the early 2000s and the cementing of distrust and fear of the Saskatchewan police, The film premiered at ImagineNATIVE in 2004, winning a Gemini Canada Award. Two Worlds Colliding also won the Golden Sheaf Award - Aboriginal at the 2005 Yorkton Film Festival.

7 Minutes (2016) 
This short documentary won the Golden Sheaf Award - Short Subject (Non-Fiction) at the 2016 Yorkton Film Festival.

Birth of a Family (2017) 
Hubbard's own experiences helped influence her decision to make Birth of a Family, about the reunion of four First Nations siblings separated as part of the Sixties Scoop. One of four reunited siblings is Betty Ann Adam, a journalist with the Saskatoon Star Phoenix, who also co-wrote the film. Adam, a Dene, had been encouraged to document her reunion with siblings Esther, Rosalie and Ben by Marie Wilson, a commissioner with Canada's Truth and Reconciliation Commission. Adam had known Hubbard for more than a decade and approached her with the idea of making the film.

The documentary was nominated for the Hot Docs Canadian International Documentary Festival 2017 and won the 2017 EIFF Audience Award for Best Documentary Feature and  2017 Special Jury Prize - Moon Jury at the 18th Annual imagineNATIVE Film + Media Arts Festival.

nîpawistamâsowin: We Will Stand Up (2019) 
nîpawistamâsowin: We Will Stand Up is a 2019 documentary that serves as Hubbard's personal reflection on the death of Colten Boushie, a young Cree man, the subsequent trial and acquittal of the man who shot him, and the aftermath of the case, which caused shock and outrage across Canada. While following the trajectory of the case and the efforts of Boushie's family to seek justice, Hubbard draws attention to prejudices in the Canadian legal system, the history of colonialism on the Prairies, and anti-Indigenous racism in Canada.

The film received the Best Canadian Feature Documentary Award at Toronto's Hot Docs Canadian International Documentary Festival, and the Colin Low Award for Canadian Documentary at Vancouver's DOXA Documentary Film Festival. Additionally, this film won the Golden Sheaf Award for Best Multicultural (Over 30 Minutes) at the 2020 Yorkton Film Festival.

References

External links
 
 Films by Tasha Hubbard at NFB.ca

1973 births
Living people
21st-century First Nations people
Canadian adoptees
Canadian documentary film directors
Canadian women film directors
Cree people
Directors of Genie and Canadian Screen Award winners for Best Documentary Film
Film directors from Saskatchewan
First Nations filmmakers
Indigenous child displacement in Canada
Métis filmmakers
People from Saskatoon
People of Métis descent
Saulteaux people
Academic staff of the University of Saskatchewan
Canadian women documentary filmmakers
First Nations women